The Kaitersberg is a low mountain crest up to  east of Bad Kötzting in the Bavarian Forest in southern Germany. Its long ridge runs eastwards towards the Großer Arber.

The highest peak on the ridge is the 1,132 metre high Großer Riedelstein with its Waldschmidt monument. On another peak, the Mittagstein, is the Kötztinger Hütte, a restaurant and mountain hut. Other prominent peaks with odd rock formations made of gneiss are the Kreuzfelsen, with its hilltop cross, and the Rauchröhren, (. Below the  Kreuzfelsen is "Highwayman Heigl's Cave" (Räuber-Heigl-Höhle), the hideout of Michael Heigl from Beckendorf, who threatened the area here in the 19th century.

The Rauchröhren offers demanding climbing area of up to 11th grade. Its rock pinnacle is the most difficult of the Bavarian Forest summits (IV).

Occasionally gliders fly above the Kaitersberg from the nearby airfield at Arnbruck, looking for lift from the winds blowing up the slopes in order to gain height when there are no thermals.

External links 
Climbing the Rauchröhren
Photographs of the Kaitersberg

Cham (district)
Mountains of Bavaria
Mountains of the Bavarian Forest